This is an incomplete list of Statutory Instruments of the United Kingdom in 1948. This listing is the complete, 46 items, "Partial dataset" as listed on www.legislation.gov.uk (as at March 2014).

1947–1948 saw the coming into force of the Statutory Instruments Act 1946 which mandated statutory instruments. Prior to this act Statutory Rules and Orders fulfilled a similar function and they formed the secondary legislation of England, Scotland and Wales prior to 1948.

Statutory Instruments

1–499
The Statutory Instruments Regulations 1947 SI 1948/1
The Statutory Instruments (Confirmatory Powers) Order 1947 SI 1948/2
Statutory Instruments Act 1946 (Commencement) Order 1947 (1948) SI 1948/3
The Treaty Of Peace (Bulgaria) Order 1948 SI 1948/114
The Treaty Of Peace (Finland) Order 1948 SI 1948/115
The Treaty Of Peace (Hungary) Order 1948 SI 1948/116
The Treaty Of Peace (Italy) Order 1948 SI 1948/117
The Treaty Of Peace (Roumania) Order 1948 SI 1948/118
The Trading With The Enemy (Enemy Territory Cessation) (Finland) Order 1948 SI 1948/157
The Trading With The Enemy (Enemy Territory Cessation) (Bulgaria) Order, 1948. SI 1948/158
The Trading With The Enemy (Enemy Territory Cessation) (Hungary) Order, 1948. SI 1948/159
The Trading With The Enemy (Enemy Territory Cessation) (Italy) Order, 1948. SI 1948/160
The Trading With The Enemy (Enemy Territory Cessation) (Roumania) Order, 1948. SI 1948/161
The Trading With The Enemy (Enemy Territory Cessation) (Trieste) Order, 1948. SI 1948/162
The Agriculture (Making Of Representations) Regulations 1948 SI 1948/191
The Compensation (Defence) Notice Of Claim Rules, 1948. SI 1948/307
Agriculture Act 1947 (Commencement) (No 1) Order 1948 SI 1948/342
Northern Ireland (Land Registry) (Appointed Day) Order 1948 SI 1948/345
Agriculture Act 1947 (Commencement) (No 2) Order 1948 SI 1948/491

500–1499
The Fire Services (Pensionable Employment) Regulations, 1948. SI 1948/581
The Factories Act, 1937 (Extension Of Section 46) Regulations, 1948. SI 1948/707
The Town And Country Planning (General Development) Order, 1948 SI 1948/958
Agriculture Act 1947 (Commencement) (No 3) Order 1948 SI 1948/1005
Trading With The Enemy (Custodian) (Amendment) Order 1948 SI 1948/1047
The Town And Country Planning (Enforcement Of Restriction Of Ribbon Development Acts) Additional Regulations, 1948. SI 1948/1126
The Local Government Superannuation (England And Scotland) Regulations, 1948. SI 1948/1131
The Building (Safety, Health & Welfare) Regulations, 1948 SI 1948/1145
The Trading With The Enemy (Enemy The Trading With The Enemy Territory Cessation) (Albania) Order, 1948. SI 1948/1177
National Assistance Act (Appointed Day) Order 1948 SI 1948/1218
The Town And Country Planning (Transfer Of Property And Officers And Compensation To Officers) Regulations, 1948. SI 1948/1236
The Stopping Up Of Highways (Concurrent Proceedings) Regulations, 1948. SI 1948/1348
The Civil Aviation (Births, Deaths And Missing Persons) Regulations, 1948. SI 1948/1411
The National Assistance (Powers Of Inspection) Regulations, 1948. SI 1948/1445
The National Assistance (Compensation) Regulations, 1948. SI 1948/1457
The Local Government (Compensation) Regulations, 1948. SI 1948/1458
The National Health Service (Superannuation) (England And Scotland) Regulations, 1948. SI 1948/1483

1500–2792
The Town And Country Planning (Enforcement Of Restriction Of Ribbon Development Acts) Regulations 1948 SI 1948/1520
The Extinguishment Or Modification Of Easements Regulations, 1948. SI 1948/1582
The Transferred Undertakings (Pensions Of Employees Losing Employment) Regulations, 1948. SI 1948/1585
The National Insurance (Isle Of Man Reciprocal Agreement) Order 1948 SI 1948/1844
Agriculture Act 1947 (Commencement) (No 4) Order 1948 SI 1948/2057
The National Insurance And Civil Service (Superannuation) Rules, 1948. SI 1948/2434
The Trading With The Enemy (Enemy Territory Cessation) (Siam) Order 1948 SI 1948/2484
The Isles Of Scilly (Local Government) Order 1948 SI 1948/2733
The Industrial Assurance ( Receipt Books) Regulations, 1948. SI 1948/2770 (section deals with Premium Receipt Books)
Greenwich Hospital School (Regulations) (Amendment) Order 1948 SI 1948/2792

Unreferenced listings
The following 8 items were previously listed on this article, however, are unreferenced on the authorities site, included here for a "no loss" approach.
The East of Christchurch-Tredegar Park Trunk Road Order 1948 SI 1948/62
Local Government (Scotland) (Glasgow Wards and Councillors) Order 1948 SI 1948/876
Local Government (Scotland) (Edinburgh Wards and Councillors) Order 1949 SI 1948/1138
Police Pensions (Scotland) Regulations 1948 SI 1948/1530
Police Pensions Regulations 1948 SI 1948/1531
Clay Works (Welfare) Special Regulations 1948 SI 1948/1547
Jute (Safety, Health and Welfare) Regulations 1948 SI 1948/1696
Residential Special Schools and Orphanages (Scotland) Grant Regulations 1948 SI 1948/2768

References

See also
List of Statutory Instruments of the United Kingdom

Lists of Statutory Instruments of the United Kingdom
Statutory Instruments